International standard ISO/IEC 11801 Information technology — Generic cabling for customer premises specifies general-purpose telecommunication cabling systems (structured cabling) that are suitable for a wide range of applications (analog and ISDN telephony, various data communication standards, building control systems, factory automation). It is published by ISO/IEC JTC 1/SC 25/WG 3 of the International Organization for Standardization (ISO) and the International Electrotechnical Commission (IEC). It covers both balanced copper cabling and optical fibre cabling.

The standard was designed for use within commercial premises that may consist of either a single building or of multiple buildings on a campus. It was optimized for premises that span up to 3 km, up to 1 km2 office space, with between 50 and 50,000 persons, but can also be applied for installations outside this range.

A major revision was released in November 2017, unifying requirements for commercial, home and industrial networks.

Classes and categories

The standard defines several link/channel classes and cabling categories of twisted-pair copper interconnects, which differ in the maximum frequency for which a certain channel performance is required:
 Class A: link/channel up to 100 kHz using Category 1 cable/connectors
 Class B: link/channel up to 1 MHz using Category 2 cable/connectors
 Class C: link/channel up to 16 MHz using Category 3 cable/connectors
 Class D: link/channel up to 100 MHz using Category 5e cable/connectors
 Class E: link/channel up to 250 MHz using Category 6 cable/connectors
 Class EA: link/channel up to 500 MHz using Category 6A cable/connectors (Amendment 1 and 2 to ISO/IEC 11801, 2nd Ed.)
 Class F: link/channel up to 600 MHz using Category 7 cable/connectors
 Class FA: link/channel up to 1000 MHz using Category 7A cable/connectors (Amendment 1 and 2 to ISO/IEC 11801, 2nd Ed.)
 Class BCT-B: link/channel up to 1000 MHz using with coaxial cabling for BCT applications. (ISO/IEC 11801-1, Edition 1.0 2017-11)
 Class I: link/channel up to 2000 MHz using Category 8.1 cable/connectors (ISO/IEC 11801-1, Edition 1.0 2017-11)
 Class II: link/channel up to 2000 MHz using Category 8.2 cable/connectors (ISO/IEC 11801-1, Edition 1.0 2017-11)
The standard link impedance is 100 Ω (The older 1995 version of the standard also permitted 120 Ω and 150 Ω in Classes A−C, but this was removed from the 2002 edition).

The standard defines several classes of optical fiber interconnect:
 OM1: Multimode fiber type 62.5 μm core; minimum modal bandwidth of 200 MHz·km at 850 nm
 OM2: Multimode fiber type 50 μm core; minimum modal bandwidth of 500 MHz·km at 850 nm
 OM3: Multimode fiber type 50 μm core; minimum modal bandwidth of 2000 MHz·km at 850 nm
 OM4: Multimode fiber type 50 μm core; minimum modal bandwidth of 4700 MHz·km at 850 nm
 OM5: Multimode fiber type 50 μm core; minimum modal bandwidth of 4700 MHz·km at 850 nm and 2470 MHz·km at 953 nm
 OS1: Single-mode fiber type 1 dB/km attenuation at 1310 and 1550 nm  
 OS1a: Single-mode fiber type 1 dB/km attenuation at 1310, 1383, and 1550 nm
 OS2: Single-mode fiber type 0.4 dB/km attenuation at 1310, 1383, and 1550 nm

Grandfathered Categories
In 2022 OM1, OM2 and OS1 have been grandfathered by ISO 11801 Standards

OM5

OM5 fiber is designed for wideband applications using SWDM multiplexing of 4–16 carriers (40G=4λ×10G, 100G=4λ×25G, 400G=4×4λ×25G) in the 850–953 nm range.

Category 7

Class F channel and Category 7 cable are backward compatible with Class D/Category 5e and Class E/Category 6. Class F features even stricter specifications for crosstalk and system noise than Class E. To achieve this, shielding was added for individual wire pairs and the cable as a whole.  Unshielded cables rely on the quality of the twists to protect from EMI. This involves a tight twist and carefully controlled design. Cables with individual shielding per pair such as category 7 rely mostly on the shield and therefore have pairs with longer twists.

The Category 7 cable standard was ratified in 2002, and primarily introduced to support 10 gigabit Ethernet over 100 m of copper cabling. It contains four twisted copper wire pairs, just like the earlier standards, terminated either with GG45 electrical connectors or with TERA connectors rated for transmission frequencies of up to 600 MHz.

However, in 2006, Category 6A was ratified for Ethernet to allow 10 Gbit/s while still using the traditional 8P8C connector (often erroneously referred to as RJ-45, a visually similar connector). Care is required to avoid signal degradation by mixing cable and connectors not designed for that use, however similar. Most manufacturers of active equipment and network cards have chosen to support the 8P8C for their 10 gigabit Ethernet products on copper and not the GG45, ARJ45, or TERA. Therefore, the Category 6 specification was revised to Category A to permit this use;  products therefore require a Class EA channel (ie, Cat 6A).

As of 2019 some equipment has been introduced which has connectors supporting the Class F (Category 7) channel.

Note, however, that Category 7 is not recognized by the TIA/EIA.

Category 7A

Class FA (Class F Augmented) channels and Category 7A cables, introduced by ISO 11801 Edition 2 Amendment 2 (2010), are defined at frequencies up to 1000 MHz, suitable for multiple applications including CATV (862 MHz).

The intent of the Class FA was to possibly support the future 40 gigabit Ethernet: 40Gbase-T. Simulation results have shown that 40 gigabit Ethernet may be possible at 50 meters and 100 gigabit Ethernet at 15 meters. In 2007, researchers at Pennsylvania State University predicted that either 32 nm or 22 nm circuits would allow for 100 gigabit Ethernet at 100 meters.

However, in 2016, the IEEE 802.3bq working group ratified the amendment 3 which defines 25Gbase-T and 40gbase-T on Category 8 cabling specified to 2000 MHz. The Class FA therefore does not support 40G Ethernet.

As of 2017 there is no equipment that has connectors supporting the Class FA (Category 7A) channel.

Category 7A is not recognized in TIA/EIA.

Category 8

Category 8 was ratified by the TR43 working group under ANSI/TIA 568-C.2-1. It is defined up to 2000 MHz and only for distances up to 30 m or 36 m, depending on the patch cords used. 

ISO/IEC JTC 1/SC 25/WG 3 developed the equivalent standard ISO/IEC 11801-1:2017/COR 1:2018, with two options:
 Class I channel (Category 8.1 cable): minimum cable design U/FTP or F/UTP, fully backward compatible and interoperable with Class EA (Category 6A) using 8P8C connectors;
 Class II channel (Category 8.2 cable): F/FTP or S/FTP minimum, interoperable with Class FA (Category 7A) using TERA or GG45.

Category 8 cabling was designed primarily for data centers where distances between switches and servers are short and is not intended for general office cabling.

Acronyms for twisted pairs

Annex E, Acronyms for balanced cables, provides a system to specify the exact construction for both unshielded and shielded balanced twisted pair cables. It uses three letters - U for unshielded, S for braided shielding, and F for foil shielding - to form a two-part abbreviation in the form of xx/xTP, where the first part specifies the type of overall cable shielding, and the second part specifies shielding for individual cable elements.

Common cable types include U/UTP (unshielded cable); U/FTP (individual pair shielding without the overall screen); F/UTP, S/UTP, or SF/UTP (overall screen without individual shielding); and F/FTP, S/FTP, or SF/FTP  (overall screen with individual foil shielding).

2017 edition

In November 2017, a new edition was released by ISO/IEC JTC 1/SC 25 "Interconnection of information technology equipment". It is a major revision of the standard which has unified several prior standards for commercial, home, and industrial networks, as well as data centers, and defines requirements for generic cabling and distributed building networks.

The new series of standards replaces the former 11801 standard and includes six parts:

Versions
 ISO/IEC 11801:1995 (Ed. 1) - First edition
 ISO/IEC 11801:2000 (Ed. 1.1) - Edition 1, Amendment 1
 ISO/IEC 11801:2002 (Ed. 2) - Second edition
 ISO/IEC 11801:2008 (Ed. 2.1) - Edition 2, Amendment 1
 ISO/IEC 11801:2010 (Ed. 2.2) - Edition 2, Amendment 2
 ISO/IEC 11801-(1-6):2017/COR 1:2018/AMD 1:2021 - Current edition

See also
 Ethernet over twisted pair
 Twisted pair
 TIA/EIA-568
 ISO/IEC JTC 1/SC 25

References

Further reading 
 International standard ISO/IEC 11801: Information technology — Generic cabling for customer premises''.
 European standard EN 50173: Information technology — Generic cabling systems. 1995.

11801